A drywall anchor, also known as a wall anchor, is an insert that, combined with the appropriate screw, can create a strong mount anywhere on a drywall panel or similar hollow wall.  A drywall anchor goes between the screw and the drywall, gripping the drywall much more effectively than a screw would.  Some have toggle arms that either drop behind the wall or expand within the cavity.  Others include wide threads that carve out grooves in the wall for traction.  All drywall anchors are designed to create a strong mount point by distributing the applied load over an increased surface area.

Drywall anchors are used when creating a mount point that does not have a wall stud behind it.

There are many types of drywall anchors.  A few common ones include expandable metal anchors (molly bolts), WallClaw anchors, toggle bolts, and self-drilling drywall anchors.

See also 
 Toggle bolt
 Molly (fastener)
 Rawlplug
 Wall plug

References

Wall anchors